Alain Wiss (born 21 August 1990) is a Swiss professional football midfielder who plays for Cham.

Club career
Wiss made his first-team debut for Luzern on 29 July 2007, replacing Pascal Bader in the 20th minute.

Wiss joined Swiss Super League club FC St. Gallen on a free transfer in July 2015, signing a two-year contract in the process.

International career
Wiss made his debut for the senior national team of his country on 26 May 2012, in the 5–3 win over Germany in a friendly match after coming on as a late substitute.  He had previously appeared at the 2012 Summer Olympics for the Swiss team.

References

External links

 

1990 births
People from Lucerne-Land District
Sportspeople from the canton of Lucerne
Living people
Association football midfielders
Swiss men's footballers
Switzerland youth international footballers
Switzerland under-21 international footballers
Switzerland international footballers
FC Luzern players
FC St. Gallen players
SC Rheindorf Altach players
SC Cham players
Swiss Super League players
Swiss 1. Liga (football) players
Austrian Football Bundesliga players
Swiss Promotion League players
Footballers at the 2012 Summer Olympics
Olympic footballers of Switzerland
Swiss expatriate footballers
Expatriate footballers in Austria
Swiss expatriate sportspeople in Austria